The 2010–11 Czech First League, known as the Gambrinus liga for sponsorship reasons, was the 18th season of the Czech Republic's top-tier football league. It began on 16 July 2010 and finished on 28 May 2011. Sparta Prague were the defending champions, having won their 11th Czech Republic championship the previous season.

Teams
FK Bohemians and SK Kladno were relegated to the 2010–11 Czech 2. Liga after finishing last and second to last, respectively, in the 2009–10 season; Bohemians were denied a license to play professional football the following season and were thus further demoted to the Bohemian Football League (third division) in June 2010.

The relegated teams were replaced by 2009–10 2. Liga champions FC Hradec Králové and runners-up FK Ústí nad Labem.

In further changes, 1. FC Brno were renamed FC Zbrojovka Brno effective to the beginning of this season.

Following trouble at their Czech Cup semi-final match, which was abandoned at half time and awarded 3–0 to the visiting team, SK Slavia Prague were fined 750,000 CZK and ordered to play three home games behind closed doors. Since there were only two home matches left in the season, one was suspended until the next season.

Stadia and locations

Notes:
 Ďolíček stadion does not meet the football association criteria, therefore Bohemians are forced to play at Synot Tip Arena.
 Městský stadion does not meet the football association criteria, therefore Ústí nad Labem are forced to play at the stadium of FK Teplice.

Managerial changes

 Příbram manager Roman Nádvorník was sacked on 26 April. Two members of staff at the club, David Vavruška and František Kopač, were appointed to serve as caretaker managers until the end of the season. On 26 May, David Vavruška was appointed manager of the club on a permanent basis.
 Mladá Boleslav appointed sporting director Ladislav Minář to the position of caretaker manager until the end of the season. Following the end of the season, Miroslav Koubek took over.

League table

Results

Top goalscorers
Final standings; Source: iDNES.cz

European competitions

2010–11 UEFA Champions League
Sparta Prague started in the second qualifying round of this season's Champions League. After defeating Latvian side FK Liepājas Metalurgs by a 5–0 aggregate scoreline, they qualified for the next round. Sparta defeated Polish side Lech Poznań in the third qualifying round, winning both matches by a score of 1–0. Losing 2–0 and 1–0 to Slovak team Žilina in the play-off round ended Sparta's involvement in the competition for this season.

2010–11 Europa League 
Baník Ostrava was the only Czech team involved in the second qualifying round of the Europa League. They got past Georgian side WIT Georgia with a 0–0 second leg result, having won the first match 6–0. In the third round, Viktoria Plzeň and Jablonec also entered the competition, however all three Czech teams lost: Baník Ostrava 3–1 on aggregate to Belarus side Dnepr Mogilev, Viktoria Plzeň 4–1 on aggregate to Turkish club Beşiktaş, and Jablonec also 4–1 on aggregate to APOEL of Cyprus.

Sparta Prague qualified for the group stage of the Europa League due to their performance in the Champions League. With results of two wins, three draws and one loss, they finished second in Group F, behind CSKA Moscow (Russia) but ahead of Palermo (Italy) and Lausanne Sport (Switzerland). They therefore advanced to the knockout phase of the competition. English side Liverpool provided the opposition; after a goalless first game in Prague, a single goal from striker Dirk Kuyt eliminated Sparta from the Europa League, 1–0 in the match and on aggregate.

See also
 2010–11 Czech Cup
 2010–11 Czech 2. Liga

References

External links
 Official website 

Czech First League seasons
Czech
1